The 1936–37 Washington Huskies men's basketball team represented the University of Washington for the  NCAA college basketball season. Led by seventeenth-year head coach Hec Edmundson, the Huskies were members of the Pacific Coast Conference and played their home games on campus at the UW Pavilion in Seattle, Washington.

In the three-way playoff, Washington lost at home to rival Washington State, who went on to defeat Oregon in Pullman.

The National Invitation Tournament (NIT) debuted the next year, and the NCAA tournament in 1939.

Postseason result

|-
!colspan=5 style=| PCC Northern Division Playoff

References

External links
Sports Reference – Washington Huskies: 1936–37 basketball season
Washington Huskies men's basketball media guide (2009–10) – History

Washington Huskies men's basketball seasons
Washington Huskies
Washington
Washington